Eugene Mullin (April 21, 1937 – April 5, 2021) was an American politician and teacher who served as the mayor and as the State Assembly member of South San Francisco. Mullin was a member of the Democratic Party.

Personal life 
Mullin was a lifelong resident of the Bay Area, and in 1967 he moved to South San Francisco to pursue teaching and coaching in the South San Francisco High School. He worked there for three decades, where he taught as a government teacher and coached basketball. Two years prior to coming he married Terri, and they had two children, Jennifer and Kevin. His wife Terri died on April 5, 2017.

During the period 1959–60, he served in the U.S. Army as a part of the Judge Advocate General Corps branch. In 1960, he received his bachelor's degree from the University of San Francisco (USF) and in 1967 he received lifetime secondary teaching credential from the USF.

Mullin was also an author of several books and curriculums about local governments. He also received numerous awards for his teaching, public service and his political role. Mullin served as the lecturer at the Institute for Local Self Government in Sacramento from 1989 to 1997 and later he continued to serve as a lecturer at the Center for Youth Citizenship in Sacramento. He also served as the president of the South San Francisco Classroom Teachers Association from 1992 to 1995.

Political life 
He began his public service in 1972 when he was appointed to the South San Francisco Planning Commission, and he later served as the member of the city's Historical Preservation Commission from 1986 to 1992.

Gene served as the mayor of South San Francisco in two one-year terms, between 1997 and 1998 and again from 2001 to 2002. Between 2002 and 2008 he served three terms as a California State Assembly member representing the 19th district.

References

External links 
 Assemblyman Gene Mullin
 Assembly Member Gene Mullin 19th  Assembly District
 Candidate Gene Mullin, SmartVoter.org

1937 births
2021 deaths
Democratic Party members of the California State Assembly
People from South San Francisco, California
University of San Francisco alumni
San Francisco Bay Area politicians
21st-century American politicians
Writers from the San Francisco Bay Area